Daily Gleaner may refer to:

The Daily Gleaner, a newspaper published in New Brunswick, Canada
The Gleaner, a daily newspaper, formerly known as The Daily Gleaner, published by the Gleaner Company in Kingston, Jamaica